The State Historical Society of North Dakota is an agency that preserves and presents history through museums and historic sites in the state of North Dakota. The agency operates the North Dakota Heritage Center in Bismarck, which serves as a history museum for the state, oversees the preservation of the state's historic places, and presents the history of the state to the public in exhibits and branch museums.  The Society also operates the Former North Dakota Executive Mansion in Bismarck.

Organization
Headquartered in Bismarck, the State Historical Society consists of one governing board of appointees and four divisions, each with a different function.

State Historical Board
The State Historical Board consists of twelve members. Seven members are appointed by the governor to staggered three-year terms. The current board president is Steve C. Martens, the vice president is Matt Dunlevy, and the secretary is Daniel Stenberg. Martens and Stenberg's terms are set to expire in June 2023.

Historic Preservation Division
The Historic Preservation Division prepares a statewide historic preservation plan and inventories, evaluates, and nominates sites to be listed on the State and National Register of Historic Places. The division assists in the preservation of North Dakota historic properties at all levels, and also reviews and comments on federally assisted projects to ensure that historic values are considered in project planning and execution.

State Archives Division
The State Archives is responsible for the documentary collections of the State Historical Society of North Dakota. It is the official state archives, and acquires and preserves all types of research materials relating to North Dakota and the Northern Great Plains, including manuscript collections, books, periodicals, maps, newspapers, audio and video materials, and photographs.

Museum and Education Division
The Museum and Education Division presents the history of North Dakota through exhibits in the North Dakota Heritage Center as well as in branch museums (such as the Pembina State Museum) and traveling exhibits. The Division staff provide technical assistance on exhibit design and collection care to the public and other museums in the state. The division is responsible for preserving and exhibiting the artifacts in the collection, including approximately 650,000 pieces in the archaeological collection and 43,000 artifacts in the history, ethnology, and natural history collections.

Support Services Division
The Support Services Division provides general supervision of all programs and responsibilities of the agency through the office of the director. Support and coordination are provided through budgeting, accounting, purchasing, personnel services, communications, inventory control, and overall security functions.

List of North Dakota State Historic Sites

References

External links
State Historical Society of North Dakota website
State Historical Society - Map view

History of North Dakota
State agencies of North Dakota
State historical societies of the United States
Historical societies in North Dakota
State history organizations of the United States